Bosellia mimetica is a species of sea slug, a marine gastropod mollusk in the family Boselliidae.

The type locality is the island of Capri, in Italy.

Description
It has a rounded, flattened body and is a mottled green, a colour that mimics that of the algae Halimeda tuna and Udotea petiolata on which it lives and feeds.

Distribution
Bosellia mimetica is found in shallow water in the Mediterranean Sea, on the Atlantic coast of Spain, in the Caribbean Sea and south to Brazil.

References

External links 

 

Boselliidae
Gastropods described in 1890